Swedish Orphan Biovitrum AB is an international biopharmaceutical company dedicated to treatments in the areas of haematology, immunology and specialty care, based in Stockholm, Sweden.  

In 2020 it had a revenue of SEK 15.261 billion and 1,509 employees.

History 

Sobi has been involved in the process development and manufacturing of recombinant protein drugs since the technology was first developed around 30 years ago, then as part of KabiVitrum.

Biovitrum was formed in 2001 through the merger of several units of Pharmacia (now Pfizer) and spun off to a consortium of investors led by Nordic Capital and MPM Capital Funds. Operations included a research unit focused on metabolic diseases, a process development unit for protein drugs and a plasma product operation. In 2002 Sobi sold its plasma operation to Octapharma as part of efforts to concentrate operations on protein-based and small molecular drugs.

In 2004, Biovitrum started to manufacture the active protein component for Wyeth’s (now Pfizer’s) ReFacto® and ReFacto/Xyntha® drugs for treatment of hemophilia, and marketing of specialty pharmaceuticals (ReFacto, Mimpara and Kineret®) was initiated in the Nordic region. In 2005, the research and development portfolio was expanded through the acquisition of Arexis, a Swedish biotech company, and the following year a partnership was formed with Syntonix (subsequently Biogen Idec) to jointly develop a drug for hemophilia B, a long-lasting recombinant factor IX Fc fusion protein candidate, rFIXFc. This partnership was extended the following year to also include the development of a long-lasting recombinant factor VIII Fc fusion protein candidate, rFVIIIFc, for the treatment of hemophilia A.

In 2008, an agreement with Amgen regarding the acquisition of the products Kepivance and Stemgen as well as a global license for Kineret was signed

In 2009, Sobi and partner Biogen Idec took the decision to enter final registration studies for the recombinant factor FIXFc. The company also received positive data regarding its Kiobrina phase II program, an investigational enzyme replacement therapy to improve growth in preterm infants who receive pasteurized breast milk or infant formula.

In 2010, Biovitrum acquired Swedish Orphan International Holding AB, a pioneer in orphan drugs, and Swedish Orphan Biovitrum AB (publ) was formed. In addition, the decisions to advance both hemophilia projects as well as Kiobrina into phase III were taken. The following year the first patient was enrolled in the phase 3 study for Kiobrina and data from the rFVIIIFc hemophilia phase I/II study were presented showing an approximately 1.7-fold increase in half-life compared with Advate. The company also established a US subsidiary.

In 2012 the supply agreement with Pfizer for ReFacto/Xyntha was extended until 2020 in addition to the agreement to return the co-promotion rights for the Nordic region for ReFacto to Pfizer for a payment of USD 47.4 M. The same year, the Sobi and partner Biogen Idec initiated global pediatric clinical trials of their long-lasting hemophilia A and B product candidates.

Guido Oelkers was appointed President and CEO in May 2017, succeeding Geoffrey McDonough. Oelkers had previously been CEO of BSN Medical.

Company 

Sobi is an international specialty healthcare company dedicated to rare diseases with a focus on treatments in haematology, immunology and speciality care. In 2013, Sobi had total revenues of SEK 2.2 billion (€253 M) and about 550 employees; by 2020 the revenue was SEK 15.261 billion and there were 1,509 employees. The company's products include Elocta and Alprolix for the treatment of haemophilia; Doptelet for ITP and CLD;  Kineret for several disorders; Synagis for RSV and Gamifant for pHLH, and the 2020 annual report shows a further six products as "pre-market" in the areas of PNH, haemophilia, sHLH, acute graft failure (aGF), ALS and chronic refractory gout. The company also market a portfolio of specialty and rare disease products for partner companies.

Acquisitions and licenses 
Synagis (From Astrazeneca)

Dova Pharmaceuticals

References 

Pharmaceutical companies of Sweden
Companies related to the Wallenberg family
Swedish companies established in 2001
Pharmaceutical companies established in 2001
Manufacturing companies based in Stockholm
Companies listed on Nasdaq Stockholm
2006 initial public offerings